is a passenger railway station located in the western part of the town of Ōi in Ashigarakami District, Kanagawa, Japan, operated by Central Japan Railway Company (JR Central).

Lines
Sagami-Kaneko Station is served by the Gotemba Line and is 8.3 kilometers from the terminus of the line at Kōzu Station.

Station layout
Sagami-Kaneko Station has a single side platform. The station is unattended. There is no station building, but only a waiting room built on the platform.

History
Sagami-Kaneko Station opened on December 15, 1956. On April 1, 1987 along with privatization and division of JNR, the station came under control of JR Central.

Station numbering was introduced to the Gotemba Line in March 2018; Sagami-Kaneko Station was assigned station number CB03.

Passenger statistics
In fiscal 2018, the station was used by an average of 461 passengers daily (boarding passengers only).

The passenger figures (boarding passengers only) for previous years are as shown below.

Surrounding area
 
Tomei Expressway Ōi-Matsuda Interchange
Ōi-Kaneko Post Office

See also
List of railway stations in Japan

References

External links

 Gotemba Line Users' Association information 

Railway stations in Japan opened in 1956
Ōi, Kanagawa